Christian Aaron Boulogne (born 1 August 1962) also known as Ari Boulogne and Ari Päffgen is a French photographer, actor and writer.

Early life
Boulogne was born in August 1962 in Paris. He is the son of German singer and actress Nico. His biological father is French actor Alain Delon although Delon has consistently denied paternity to Boulogne. He was initially raised by his mother before he was adopted by Delon's mother Édith and her second husband Paul Boulogne whose surname he legally took. He spent most of his childhood in Bourg-la-Reine. In 2001 and 2019, Boulogne attempted to sue Delon for recognition of paternity but without success.

Career
Boulogne reunited with his mother as a teenager and began his career as an actor. He made appearances in films directed by Philippe Garrel including The Inner Scar which he starred in with Nico and The Secret Son in which he was credited as Ari Päffgen. He also made an appearance in Paul Morrissey's Mixed Blood. After acting, Boulogne took on a career as a photographer.

Personal life
Boulogne has two children, a son Charles born in 1999, and a daughter Blanche born in 2006. In 2001, he published a memoir Love Never Forgets in which he elaborates on his relationship with his mother.

In popular culture
He was portrayed by Sandor Funtek in the film Nico, 1988.

Selected filmography
 1972: The Inner Scar
 1979: The Secret Son
 1984: Mixed Blood
 2002: La Repentie
 2003: Nathalie...
 2004: Pas sages

References

1962 births
Living people
French people of German descent
French male actors
French photographers
French male writers
People from Paris
French actors